The 1997–98 season was Blackpool F.C.'s 90th season (87th consecutive) in the Football League. They competed in the 24-team Division Two, then the third tier of English league football, finishing twelfth.

Gary Megson left the club during the close season, in favour of managing Stockport County. His replacement was Nigel Worthington, who began in a player-manager capacity in his first managerial role.

Phil Clarkson was the club's top scorer, with sixteen goals (thirteen in the league, two in the FA Cup and one in the League Trophy).

Table

References

1997-98
Bla